The Grand Carousel (referred to simply as the Merry-Go-Round) was built in 1926 for the Philadelphia sesquicentennial by William H. Dentzel. Finished too late for the sesquicentennial, it was installed at Kennywood Park outside Pittsburgh in 1927. A Pittsburgh History and Landmarks Foundation Historic Landmark, the Grand Carousel is Kennywood's third and largest carousel.

The music on the carousel is provided by a 1916 Wurlitzer Military Band Organ, Style #153 (one of the oldest Wurlitzer #153's in existence). It is a four-abreast carousel (meaning that it has four rows of animals) and travels in a counter-clockwise direction with over 1,500 lights decorating the ride. 

The two notable non-equine animals featured on the ride are the tiger and the lion. These two non-equine animals qualify this carousel as a menagerie carousel. It is one of the three rides at Kennywood with a start/stop bell that dates back to the origin of the ride.

Restoration 
Both the carousel and band organ were restored in the winter of 1975/76 for the 1976 season. The carousel was restored again in the winter of 2004/05, and the band organ in the winter of 2010/11.

Notes

Amusement rides introduced in 1927
Buildings and structures in Allegheny County, Pennsylvania
Carousels in the United States
Carousels in Pennsylvania
Pittsburgh History & Landmarks Foundation Historic Landmarks
Kennywood